Cavan Scott (born 18 April 1973), is a New York Times bestselling comic writer and author. He is best known for his work on a variety of spin-offs from both Doctor Who and Star Wars, as well as comics and novels for Teen Titans, Black Adam, Ghostbusters, Transformers, Back to the Future, Vikings, Pacific Rim, Sherlock Holmes, and Penguins of Madagascar.

Cavan Scott, along with Justina Ireland, Claudia Gray, Daniel Jose Older, and Charles Soule are crafting a new era in the Star Wars publishing world called Star Wars: The High Republic. Cavan's first contribution to the era was a comic book series released through Marvel Comics titled Star Wars: The High Republic. and he has also written two novels in the series, the New York Times bestseller, The Rising Storm and Path of Vengeance, numerous short stories in Star Wars Insider and the Life Day Treasury, a four issue mini-series for IDW, The Monster of Temple Peak and the audio drama, Tempest Runner.

In April 2020, Vault Comics announced their supernatural spy series Shadow Service, written by Cavan Scott with art by Corin M. Howell, for release in July 2020. This was Cavan Scott's first creator-owned comic series.  He has since written three more creator-owned series: The Ward, from Dark Horse Comics, Sleep Terrors from Legendary Comics, and Dead Seas from Dark Horse. 

In April 2016, his 2016 World Book Day book Star Wars: The Escape became the UK's number one bestselling book.

He was also script editor on the first series of Highlander audiobooks and produced Blakes 7 for Big Finish Productions.

He has written a number of books based upon the BBC Television series Countryfile and Planet Dinosaur, as well as children's books and comic based on such popular children's franchises Skylanders, Disney Infinity, Adventure Time, and Angry Birds.

He wrote a series of Sherlock Holmes novels for Titan Books, the first of which, "The Patchwork Devil", was published in 2016.

Scott conceived and launched Countryfile Magazine in 2007 and has written for over 30 national magazines and newspapers. He regularly appears on local and national radio commentating on rural affairs and has been a judge of various countryside awards including the RSPB Farming for Nature Award and the FARMA Farm Retailer of the Year. He appeared on BBC Breakfast to discuss the casting of Peter Capaldi as Doctor Who's Twelfth Doctor.

He also wrote serialized children's books for Fiction Express, including two volumes of Snaffles the Cat Burglar.

Bibliography

Comics
Star Wars
Star Wars Adventures (2017), published by IDW Publishing
Star Wars Adventures: Heroes of the Galaxy (2017), published by IDW Publishing
Star Wars Adventures: Defend the Republic (2017), published by IDW Publishing
Star Wars Adventures: Smuggler’s Blues (2018), published by IDW Publishing
Star Wars Adventures: Tales from Vader’s Castle  (2018), published by IDW Publishing
Star Wars Adventures: Return to Vader’s Castle  (2019), published by IDW Publishing
Star Wars Adventures: Shadow of Vader’s Castle (2020), published by IDW Publishing
Star Wars Adventures: Ghosts of Vader’s Castle (2021), published by IDW Publishing
Star Wars: The High Republic (2021), published by Marvel Comics
Star Wars: The High Republic: The Monster of Temple Peak (2021), published by IDW Publishing
Star Wars: Life Day (2021), published by Marvel Comics
Star Wars: The High Republic (2022), published by Marvel Comics
Star Wars: Yoda (2022), publisher by Marvel Comics
Star Wars: Tales From the Rancor’s Pit (2022), published by Dark Horse Comics
Creator-owned comics
Shadow Service (2020), published by Vault Comics
The Ward (2022), published by Dark Horse Comics
Sleep Terrors (2022), published by Legendary Comics
Dead Seas (2022), published by IDW Publishing
DC Superheroes
Titans United (2021-2022), published by DC Comics
Black Adam: The Justice Society Files (2022), published by DC Comics
Black Adam (2022) published by DC Comics
Titan United: Bloodpact (2022), published by DC Comics
Doctor Who
Mistaken Identity (2010), in Doctor Who Adventures
Creature Feature (2010), in Doctor Who Adventures
Doctor Who - The Ninth Doctor (2015–present), published by Titan Comics
Doctor Who - Holiday Special (2015), published by Titan Comics
Doctor Who - Supremacy of the Cybermen (2016), published by Titan Comics
Vikings
Vikings (2016), published by Titan Comics
Vikings: Uprising (2016), published by Titan Comics
Vikings: Godhead (2017), published by Titan Comics
Power Rangers
Game Over (2005), in Jetix Magazine
Starr Stuck (2004), in Jetix Magazine
Nick Nitro & Booster (Ongoing, 2010–2011) in Nitro
Krash Test Bunny (Ongoing, 2010–2011) in Nitro
Minnie The Minx, Roger the Dodger, The Bash Street Kids, Gnasher and Gnipper, Bananaman (2014–present) in The Beano
Adventure Time (2015), published by Titan Comics
Penguins of Madagascar - (2015–2016), published by Titan Comics
Not with a Bang (2016),  published in Vertigo: SFX by Vertigo Comics
Tekken: Blood Feud - (2017), published by Titan Comics
Star Wars Adventures Annual: The Lost Eggs of Livorno-(2018), published by IDW Publishing
Pacific Rim: Aftermath (2018) published by Legendary Comics
Pacific Rim: Amara (2019) published by Legendary Comics
Pacific Rim: Black-out (2021) Published by Legendary Comics
Sonic the Hedgehog Annual: Curse of the Pyramid (2019), published by IDW Publishing
Ghostbusters 35th Anniversary Collection (2019), published by IDW Publishing
Transformers/Back to the Future (2020), published by IDW Publishing
Assassin's Creed Valhalla: Song of Glory (2020), published by Dark Horse Comics

Books
Doctor Who
Wit, Wisdom, and Timey-Wimey Stuff: The Quotable Dr. Who  (2001) (with Mark Wright)
Project: Valhalla (2005) (with Mark Wright)
The Sarah Jane Adventures: Wraith World (2010)
Who-ology: The Official Doctor Who Miscellany (2013) (with Mark Wright)
Doctor Who: Dalek (2017) (with George Mann and Justin Richards)
Doctor Who: The Shining Man (2017)
Doctor Who: The Ninth Doctor: Volume 1 Weapons of Past Destruction (2017) (with Blair Shedd and Rachael Stott)
Doctor Who: The Ninth Doctor: Volume 2 Doctormania (2017) (with Adriana Melo and Chris Bolson)
Doctor Who: The Ninth Doctor: Volume 3 Official Secrets (2017) (with Adriana Melo and Chris Bolson)
Doctor Who: The Ninth Doctor: Volume 4 Sin Eaters (2018) (with Adriana Melo and Chris Bolson)
Doctor Who: The Missy Chronicles (2018) (with Jac Rayner, Paul Magrs, James Gross, Peter Anghelides, Richard Dinnick)
Who-ology: The Official Doctor Who Miscellany: The Regenerated Edition (2018) (with Mark Wright)
Doctor  Who: The Lost Dimension Book One  (2018) (with George Mann, Nick Abadzis, Rachael Stott, Cris Bolson, Adriana Melo, Mariano Laclaustra, Leandro Casco, Iolanda Zanfardino, Rod Fernandes, Marco Lesko, Carlos Cabrera, Triona Farrell, and Hi-Fi)
Doctor  Who: The Lost Dimension Book Two  (2018) (with George Mann, Nick Abadzis, Rachael Stott, Mariano Laclaustra, Alex Ronald, Leondro Casco)
Countryfile
Countryfile: Great British Walks (2010), (Editor)
Countryfile Perfect Days Out (2010)
John Craven's Countryfile Companion (2010) (collaboration with John Craven)
Countryfile: Adam's Farm: My Life on the Land (2011) (with Adam Henson)
The Obverse Book of Ghosts (2010) (Editor)
Planet Dinosaur (2011)
Blake's 7: The Forgotten (2012) (with Mark Wright)
Skylanders
Skylanders: The Machine of Doom (2012) (writing as Onk Beakman)
Skylanders: Official Annual 2013 (2012)
Skylanders: Quiz Quest (2012)
Skylanders: The Mask of Power: Spyro vs the Mega Monsters (2013) (writing as Onk Beakman)
Skylanders: The Mask of Power: Gill Grunt and the Curse of the Fishmaster (2013) (writing as Onk Beakman)
Skylanders: The Mask of Power: Lightning Rod faces the Cyclops Queen (2013) (writing as Onk Beakman)
Skylanders: Official Annual 2014 (2013)
Skylanders: The A-Z of Skylands (2013)
Skylanders Giants: Master Eon’s Official Guide (2013)
Skylanders Universe: The Ultimate Guide (2014)
Skylanders SWAP Force: Master Eon’s Official Guide (2014)
Skylanders: The Mask of Power: Terrifin Battles The Boom Brother (2014) (writing as Onk Beakman)
Skylanders: The Mask of Power: Cynder Comfronts the Weather Wizard (2014) (writing as Onk Beakman)
Skylanders: Time Twister (2014) (writing as Onk Beakman)
Skylanders: The Mask of Power: Erupter Meets the Nightmare Kings (2014) (writing as Onk Beakman)
Skylanders: Official Annual 2015 (2014)
Skylanders: The Mask of Power: Trigger Happy Targets The Evil Kaos (2014) (writing as Onk Beakman)
Skylanders: The Mask of Power: Stump Smash Crosses the Bone Dragon (2016) (writing as Onk Beakman)
Angry Birds
The Angry Birds Official Sticker Book (2013)
The World of Angry Birds Official Guide (2013)
Angry Birds Treasure Island (2015)
The Official Beano Sticker Book (2014)
Mama Barkfingers (2014)
The Hunted (2014)
Billy Button (2014)
Pest Control (2014)
The Changeling (2014)
Snaffles the Cat Burglar (2014)
Warhammer 40,000: Plague Harvest (2015)
Dennis the Menace: The Golden Catapult (2015)
Penguins of Madagascar
Penguins of Madagascar: Operation: Heist (2015)
Penguins of Madagascar: Elitist of the Elite (2016)
Penguins of Madagascar: Secret Paws (2016)
Adventure Park
Adventure Park: Pirate Peril (2016)
Adventure Park: Dinosaur Danger (2016)
Adventure Park: Rainforest Riot (2016)
Adventure Park: Medieval Madness (2016)
Adventure Park: Monster Mayhem (2016)
Adventure Park: Cosmic Chaos (2016)
Adventure Park: Candy Crisis (2016)
Adventure Park: Pyramid Panic (2016)
LEGO DC Super Heroes Character Encyclopedia (2016)
Snaffles and the Moonfish Mystery (2016)
Curious Cal and the Wish Machine (2016)
Sherlock Holmes: The Patchwork Devil (2016)
Star Wars
Star Wars: Adventures in Wild Space - The Escape (2016)
Star Wars: Adventures in Wild Space - The Snare (2016)
Star Wars: Adventures in Wild Space - The Steal (2016)
Star Wars: Adventures in Wild Space - The Cold (2017)
Choose Your Destiny: A Han and Chewie Adventure (2018) (with Elsa Charretier)
Choose Your Destiny: A Luke and Leia Adventure (2018) (with Elsa Charretier)
Dooku, Jedi Lost (2019)
Choose Your Destiny: An Obi-Wan and Anakin Adventure (2019) (with Elsa Charretier)
Choose Your Destiny: A Finn and Poe Adventure (2019) (with Elsa Charretier)
Star Wars: The Rising Storm (2021)
The Afterblight Chronicles
Children of the Cull (2016)
End of the End (2016) (with Paul Kane and Simon Guerrier)
Sherlock Holmes: Cry of the Innocent (2017)
Ali-A Adventures: Game On (2017) (with Ali-A and Aleksandar Sotirovski)
Copa90: Our World Cup – A fan’s guide to 2018 (2018) (with Aladair Cullen, Jack Harry, Gaby Kirschner, Eli Mengem, Martino Simcik, Neil Stacey, Lawrence Tallis, and Kevin McGivern)
Warhammer Adventures: Warped Galaxies
Attack of the Necron (2019)
Claws of the Genestealer (2019)
Secrets of the Tau (2019)

Radio plays
Doctor Who
Project: Twilight (2001) (with Mark Wright)
The Church and the Crown (2002) (with Mark Wright)
Project Lazarus (2003) (with Mark Wright)
The Prisoner of Peladon (2009) (with Mark Wright)
Project: Destiny (2010) (with Mark Wright)
The Many Deaths of Jo Grant (2011) (with Mark Wright)
The Nu-Humans (2012) (with Mark Wright)
The Companion Chronicles - Project: Nirvana (2012) (with Mark Wright)
Night of the Whisper (2013) (with Mark Wright)
Masters of Earth (2015) with Mark Wright)
Eternal Battle (2017) (with Mark Wright)
The Lost Angel (2017)
The Lost Magic (2017)
The Lost Flame (2017) (with George Mann)
The Bleeding Heart in The Ninth Doctor Chronicles (2017) (with Una McCormack, Scott Handcock, and James Goss)
Devil in the Mist (2019)
2000 AD
Judge Dredd: For King and Country (2003)
Counter-Measures
Peshka (2013) (with Mark Wright)
The Tomorrow People
The Warlock's Dance (2004)
Highlander
Kurgan Rising (2009) (with Mark Wright)
Blake's 7
The Armageddon Storm Parts 1-3 (2013) (with Mark Wright)
Blake's Story (2013) (with Mark Wright)
Defector (2014) (with Mark Wright)
Planetfall (2014) (with Mark Wright)
Secrets (2014) (with Mark Wright)
Cold Fury (2013) (with Mark Wright)
Caged (2013) (with Mark Wright)
Shock Troops as a part of Crossfire Part 2 Box Set (2018)
Pathfinder Chronicles
The Skin Saw Murders (2015)
Fortress of the Stone Giants (2015)
The Spires of Xin-Shalast (2015)
The Half-Dead City (2015)
Empty Graves (2015)
Shifting Sands (2016)
The Omega Factor
Legion (2015)
The Confessions of Dorian Gray
Heart and Soul (2015)
Iris Wildthyme
Iris Wildthyme and the Claws of Santa (2009) (with Mark Wright)
The Iris Wildthyme Appreciation Society (2012)
Whatever Happened to Iris Widthyme (2013) (with Mark Wright)
High Spirits (2015)
"Vienna: Underworld" in Vienna Series 02 (2015)
Counter-Measures: New Horizons (2015) (with Mark Wright)
Star Wars: Dooku, Jedi Lost (2019)
Sherlock Holmes: The Voice of Treason (2020) (with George Mann)
Star Wars: The High Republic: Tempest Runner (2021)

Short stories
Star Wars
"Time of Death" (2017), in From a Certain Point of View
"Fake It Till You Make It" (2020), in The Empire Strikes Back - From a Certain Point of View
Doctor Who
"Priceless Junk" (2009), in Short Trips: Indefinable Magic (with Mark Wright)
"Twilight's End" (2008), in Short Trips: Defining Patterns (with Mark Wright)
"Faithful Friends" (2007), in Short Trips: The Ghosts of Christmas (with Mark Wright)
"Be Forgot" (2004), in Short Trips: A Christmas Treasury (with Mark Wright)
"Feast of the Stone" (2004), in BBC Vampires (with Mark Wright)
"Inmate 280" (2003), in Short Trips: Steel Skies
Warhammer 40,000
"Doom Flight" (2013)
Judge Dredd
"Dog Fight" (2005), in The Judge Dredd Megazine
"'Roaches" (2013), in The Judge Dredd Megazine
Iris Wildthyme
"The Unhappy Medium" (2009), in Iris Wildthyme and the Celestial Omnibus (with Mark Wright)
"The Colonic in Space" (2010), in Iris: Abroad (with Mark Wright)
Original works
"Graveyard Slot" (2005), in The Undead
"The Last" (2007), in Desolate Places
"Missed Call" (2010), in The Obverse Book of Ghosts
"Fairest of them All" (2013) in Resurrection Engines
"The Demon Slasher of Seven Sisters" (2013), in The Encounters of Sherlock Holmes
"Alternative Facts" (2017), in Judge Dredd: Year Two Omnibus

External links
 Cavan Scott's website

Notes

1973 births
English science fiction writers
Living people
The Beano people
English male novelists